Munther Yousef Raja (born 22 February 1993) is a Jordanian footballer who plays for Al-Fahaheel.

References

External links
 
 

1993 births
Living people
Jordanian footballers
Jordan international footballers
Al-Wehdat SC players
Al-Hussein SC (Irbid) players
Jordanian people of Palestinian descent
Footballers at the 2014 Asian Games
Association football defenders
Asian Games competitors for Jordan